Strike Fighter Squadron 136 (VFA-136) also known as the "Knighthawks" is a United States Navy strike fighter squadron based at Naval Air Station Lemoore, California. The "Knighthawks" are an operational fleet squadron flying the F/A-18E Super Hornet. They are  homeported at NAS Lemoore and are currently assigned to Carrier Air Wing Seven, tail code AG. Their radio callsign is Gunstar.

Squadron insignia and nickname
The squadron's "Knighthawk" insignia and nickname were approved by Chief of Naval Operations on 23 May 1985 and have remained unchanged.

History

1980s
Strike Fighter Squadron One Three Six was established on 1 July 1985 at Naval Air Station Lemoore, California under the instruction of VFA-125. The squadron received their first F/A-18A Hornet on 7 January 1986, and a month later they moved to their new homeport of Naval Air Station Cecil Field, Florida.

VFA-136 first deployed in September 1987 with Carrier Air Wing Thirteen on board .

1990s

During USS Dwight D. Eisenhowers "Centennial Cruise" in 1990, the squadron participated in exercises with French, British, Italian and Tunisian forces.  The cruise took a serious turn after Iraq invaded Kuwait on 2 August 1990. In support of Operation Desert Shield, USS Dwight D. Eisenhower was on station in the Red Sea within 36 hours, becoming the first carrier to conduct sustained operations in the area. After returning from deployment in November 1990, the squadron upgraded to the new Lot 13 Night Attack F/A-18C. The squadron became the first fully operational night strike Hornet squadron in the Navy.

In October 1991, the squadron and USS Dwight D. Eisenhower were back in the Persian Gulf enforcing the peace accords set after Operation Desert Storm. Upon completion of those operations, the team transitioned to the North Atlantic to participate in the North Atlantic Treaty Organization (NATO)  Exercise "TEAMWORK '92". This would be the largest NATO exercise in over three years.

The squadron next deployed aboard the Navy's newest aircraft carrier,  for her maiden cruise in May 1994. USS George Washington was the flagship for the celebration of the 50th Anniversary of D-Day, hosting President Bill Clinton. During the cruise, the squadron participated in NATO Operations Deny Flight (over Bosnia-Herzegovina), Southern Watch and Vigilant Warrior (both in the Persian Gulf). In addition to supporting NATO, the squadron also participated in exercises in England, France, Sicily, Jordan, Tunisia, Bahrain and Oman. The squadron returned from deployment in November 1994.

The squadron deployed again aboard USS George Washington in January 1996 in support of Operation Decisive Endeavor over Bosnia-Herzegovina and Operation Southern Watch.

This "world cruise" included a tour of duty in the Persian Gulf in support of Operation Southern Watch and culminated in the arrival of USS John C. Stennis in their new homeport of San Diego, California.

Immediately following this deployment, the squadron relocated to Naval Air Station Oceana in December 1998  as mandated by the Base Realignment and Closure decision.

2000s
In February 2000, the squadron embarked aboard USS Dwight D. Eisenhower to the Mediterranean.  In March 2000, the squadron flew in support of the Dayton Accords governing the peace between the former warring factions in Bosnia and other parts of the Balkans. USS Dwight D. Eisenhower then proceeded to the Persian Gulf, in support of Operation Southern Watch, returning to Norfolk on 18 August 2000.

In August 2010 the squadron won the Strike Fighter Weapons School Atlantic (SFWSL) Bombing Derby trophy for the first time in the squadron's history. The squadron also won the 2010 CVW-1 Top Hook Award.

In January 2011, the squadron embarked on a deployment to the Mediterranean Sea, the North Arabian Sea, and Persian Gulf aboard . While deployed, the squadron flew combat sorties in the skies over Afghanistan in support Operation Enduring Freedom and over Iraq in support of Operation New Dawn while also supporting anti-piracy operations and special forces in multiple theaters. The squadron won their tenth straight CVW-1 Top Hook Award posting a 3.706 with a 96% boarding rate for the duration of cruise.

Following deployment the squadron were awarded their second straight Strike Fighter Weapons School Atlantic (SFWSL) Bombing Derby trophy. In 2011 the squadron won the Battle Effectiveness Award for the first time in the squadron's twenty-six year history.

In the summer of 2016, the squadron was moved from NAS Oceana to NAS Lemoore.

The squadron was expected to deploy aboard the USS Harry S. Truman in September 2019 but, due to extensive electrical problems, the Truman was unable to get underway until November 2019 with an expected return in March 2020.  The Truman and associated Strike Group were mere hours from beginning their transit through the Red Sea and, ultimately, the Suez Canal to begin their voyage home when they were ordered to remain on station due to hostilities with Iran.  The Strike Group was again extended due to COVID-19, finally returning to homeport in Norfolk, VA in June 2020 after spending nearly four months straight without a port visit, two months of which were off the eastern coast of the United States.

See also
List of United States Navy aircraft squadrons
Naval aviation
Modern US Navy carrier air operations
List of Inactive United States Navy aircraft squadrons

References

External links
 Official VFA-136 Knighthawks web site

Strike fighter squadrons of the United States Navy
Military units and formations in Virginia